Últimas Noticias is a daily newspaper in Venezuela, currently British-owned and characterized by The Guardian as a "pro-Maduro tabloid".

Últimas Noticias was founded in Caracas on 16 September 1941 after the pro-freedom measures implemented by President Medina Angarita. It initially bore the name Diario del Pueblo (the people's newspaper), and was created by Víctor Simone D'Lima, "Kotepa" Delgado, Vaughan Salas Lozada and Pedro Beroes. Miguel Ángel Capriles Ayala acquired the majority of the shares in 1948. He was the president of La Cadena Capriles, until his death in 1996. His son, Miguel Angel Capriles López assumed that position in 1998 until 2013, starting a modernization process that lasted more than 12 years. On 16 October 2000 it was relaunched, adopting a more colloquial tone and aiming to be more of a guide to daily life. In June 2002 it began printing in colour on every page and launched its Sunday edition aimed to a more middle class audience. From 2004 to 2006 it launched four regional editions (for different areas of Greater Caracas) in addition to the national one. In 2009 started the integration of all its newspapers with digital platforms and moved to a state-of-the-art facility, the most modern newsroom in the country, in 2012. In 2013, the newspaper was sold to an "investment group" that was allegedly more sympathetic to the Venezuelan government for $160–180 million.

It is known for its direct and lively presentation of news, with a strong emphasis on striking graphics and layout and an extensive use of photographs. Últimas Noticias at its outset was a tabloid consisting of only eight pages and costing just one cent. As of 2008, it published 170,000 copies a day (280,000 to 320,000 on Sundays). According to its own market studies 96.3% of its readers are from "social sectors C, D and E", the lower-income classes, and its supporters call it "el periódico del pueblo" (the people's newspaper). Seventy percent of its circulation is in greater Caracas, while the rest of the country accounts for the remaining 30%.

Exhibiting a strong emphasis on a striking appearance and graphic elements, it was originally divided into sections such as Hoy (Today), which covered national politics; Venezuela Adentro (Inside Venezuela), which covered domestic news; Cartelera Cinematográfica (box office); Vida de Juan Vicente Gómez (caricatures); El Cuento de Hoy (Story of the Day); El Rincón de la Mujer (Women's Corner); Crónicas del Ávila (pieces by various guest contributors); plus sections devoted to sports and other topics. Politics 
Ideologically Últimas Noticias is in the center-left of the political spectrum, and is friendlier to President Hugo Chávez than Venezuela's other two top dailies, El Nacional and El Universal. A 2005 survey of the newspaper's readership carried out by polling firm Datanálisis found that their most appreciated value was "independence," and the paper was perceived by readers in the following way:

74.2% as an unbiased source
13.5% as biased towards the government
3.6% as biased towards the opposition

In 1946 Últimas Noticias sold around 15,000 copies a day. Its editor Miguel Ángel Capriles Ayala, in his memoir Memorias de la Inconformidad, wrote that in those years about 80 percent of the staff and directors of the newspaper belonged to the Communist Party.

Sister publications
In 1956 Capriles Ayala acquired the newspaper La Esfera, which was sold in 1966. On February 3, 1958, he founded the evening newspaper El Mundo. In 1959 he bought the magazine Élite; 1962 he acquired the magazines Venezuela Gráfica and Páginas (the latter of which folded in 1999); in 1966 he founded Diario Crítica in Maracaibo, which closed in 1990; in 1968 he founded the Suplemento Cultural to Últimas Noticias; in 1969 he founded the sports daily Extra (which folded a year later). In 1970 he founded Dominical, the Sunday magazine of Últimas Noticias, and the magazin Hipódromo; in 1972 he bought Kena (folded in 1999) and founded Kabala (folded in 1999) and Alarma (folded in 1973); in 1974 he founded the Maracaibo newspaper El Vespertino, which folded in 1982; in 1988 he founded Guía Hípica, which folded in 2007. In 2005 La Cadena Capriles founded URBE and the sports publication Líder and acquired Urbe Bikini; in 2009, it founded El Mundo Economía y Negocios.

Other media enterprises currently owned by La Cadena Capriles include La Cadena Multicolor and PlanetaurbeTV.

Changes in the newspaper
Until 1999, the visual format of Últimas Noticias did not follow any particular formula and according to one commentator, the newspaper looked disorganized. But as of October 2000, certain new parameters were laid down in an effort to make the layout simpler and better organized. At the same time the newspaper adopted a more colloquial tone and aimed to be more of a guide to daily life.

In mid-2002 the newspaper began printing in colour on every page. Between 2004 and 2006 it launched four regional editions (for different areas of Greater Caracas) in addition to the national one.

Between 2009 and 2011, Últimas Noticias became a major multimedia operation, with its website providing an abundance of material, including podcasts, videos, video chats, interviews, sound galleries, and the like. Últimas Noticias radio presents music and interviews around the clock. Launched the first news app in the country and develop its own low cost tablet.

In 2013, the British financier Robert Hanson bought Ultimas Noticias for his private company Hanson Family Holdings for a figure reported as US$98 million. In 2014, he was accused by newspaper staff of turning it into "a Socialist Party mouthpiece", but the editor, Héctor Dávila, replied that his only instructions from Hanson were "to run a balanced and profitable newspaper".

Controversies
Pre-2013 sale
Marcos Ruiz, a reporter for Últimas Noticias, was one of a group of journalists handing out leaflets in Caracas in favor of press freedom on August 13, 2009, when he was set upon by at least four supporters of President Hugo Chávez, who punched and beat him with clubs. According to Últimas Noticias, "12 journalists employed by its newspaper group were injured. The paper ran a front-page headline declaring: "Enough with the violence!".

Reporters attacked
According to PEN, the other journalists attacked on August 13 included Manuel Alejandro Álvarez, César Batiz, Greasi Bolaños, Sergio Moreno González, Octavio Hernandez, Jesús Hurtado, Gabriela Iribarren, Glexis Pastran, Fernando Peñalver, and Marie Rondón, all of them employees of La Cadena Capriles. "The journalists, who were wearing press credentials, were protesting against the government's approval of a new education law that would restrict press freedom", noted PEN. "The assailants reportedly hit and kicked the journalists, leaving them seriously injured, as well as accusing them of being 'defenders of the oligarchy' in the 'people's territory'. The government reportedly issued a statement condemning the attack and the Attorney General started an investigation. However, as of 21 August only one suspect had been arrested, despite the fact that there are reportedly photos of the attack that should make it easy to identify the others. According to local news reports, the assailants work for the government-owned broadcaster AvilaTV. Government officials, including President Chávez, have reportedly accused the 12 journalists who were attacked of being 'provocative' and taking a 'political stand,' leading them to fear action that the Attorney General may take action against them".

César Batiz investigated the assassination of journalist Orel Sambrano, who at the time of his murder had been writing columns about the rise in drug trafficking, and has written (in collaboration with Jesus Yajure) about the failure of police to arrest suspects in the killing of journalist, film producer, and entrepreneur Jacinto Lopez.

Criticism of Venezuelan governmentÚltimas Noticias published a great deal of investigative journalism that has placed it at odds with the administration of Hugo Chávez. Among an example of this is an August 2011 exposé by César Batiz of Derwick Associates, a firm accused of bribery and overbilling and currently the target of several lawsuits in the United States.      .

At a meeting of his Council of Ministers in May 2012, Chávez accused Últimas Noticias of manipulating information concerning the announcement of his presidential candidacy. "First I get this copy where it says 'Chávez will announce his candidacy between June 1 and 11'", said Chávez. "And later I receive another copy ... and the headline says: 'Chávez still doesn't know when he will announce his candidacy'. So I ask myself: why did they change the headline? What are they trying to manipulate?'". Últimas Noticias explained that it publishes six editions a day and that headlines are frequently changed from one edition to the next in order to improve on clarity. The second headline Chávez saw had in fact appeared in that day's first edition, while the first headline he saw had appeared in the other five editions.

Post-2013 sale
In 2013, Últimas Noticias'' was sold to a party then unidentified and commentary criticizing the Venezuelan government declined. This was supposedly due to the new owners of Útimas Noticias being close to the Venezuelan government. It later transpired that the new owner was the British financier Robert Hanson.

Censorship allegations
Following alleged censorship by the newspapers director during the 2014 Venezuelan protests, Chief Researcher Tamoa Calzadilla along with others resigned. Nathalie Alvaray, the first woman Media VP in the country and leader of all the innovation and convergence projects resigned a week before

In January 2015, Venezuelans responded on social media to the controversial headline, "Maduro's Tour Was a Success", portraying that President Nicolas Maduro's meeting with Saudi Arabia was successful despite other outlets calling it a failure. The title led to Venezuelans making their own satirical headlines criticizing the newspaper's allegedly biased title.

References

External links 
Últimas Noticias on-line

Spanish-language newspapers
Newspapers published in Venezuela
Publishing companies established in 1941
Mass media in Caracas
Spanish-language websites
1941 establishments in Venezuela